PBA may refer to:

Places 
Province of Buenos Aires, a province in Argentina

Facilities and structures 
Pine Bluff Arsenal, Jefferson County, Arkansas, USA; a military installation near the city of Pine Bluff
Pinnacle Bank Arena, a sports arena in Lincoln, Nebraska, USA

Transportation 
Thalys PBA, trainsets of the SNCF TGV Réseau

Aviation
Provincetown-Boston Airlines (IATA airline code: PT; ICAO airline code: PBA) USA; defunct
PB Air (IATA airline code: 9Q; ICAO airline code: PBA) Thailand; defunct

Organizations  
Advertising Board of the Philippines, formerly the Philippine Board of Advertising
Palm Beach Atlantic University
Police Benevolent Association, or Patrolmen's Benevolent Association
PBA Partylist, or Puwersa ng Bayaning Atleta, a political party in the Philippines

Sports leagues 
Philippine Basketball Association
Professional Bowlers Association, professional tenpin bowling organization in the United States

Other uses 
Lead-Acid Battery (PbA)
Partial-birth abortion or intact dilation and extraction
Peroxybenzoic acid
 Phone Book Access, a Bluetooth profile
Pre-boot authentication
Probability bounds analysis, a mathematical method of risk analysis
Pseudobulbar affect, the pathological expression of laughter, crying, or smiling
Project bank account

See also

 BPA (disambiguation)